Karel Hromas (born January 27, 1986) is a Czech professional ice hockey left winger who is currently a free agent. He most recently played for Vipers de Montpellier of the FFHG Division 1, the second-tier hockey league in France.

Career
Hromas was selected by the Chicago Blackhawks in the 4th round (123rd overall) of the 2004 NHL Entry Draft from HC Sparta Praha's youth setup after a productive 2003-04 season, scoring 10 goals and 10 assists in 21 games. He also made his debut for Sparta Praha's main roster during the 2003-04 season but failed to score any points in 13 games. Following his draft selection, Hromas moved to North America to play junior hockey for the Everett Silvertips of the Western Hockey League. He stayed for two seasons before returning to Sparta Praha in 2006. In 2011, Hromas joined fellow Czech Extraliga team Piráti Chomutov.

In 2014, Hromas left the Czech Republic and moved to the Ligue Magnus in France, signing for Pingouins de Morzine-Avoriaz. He then moved to the United Kingdom to play in the Elite Ice Hockey League with the Edinburgh Capitals in the summer of 2016.

Career statistics

Regular season and playoffs

International

References

External links

1986 births
Living people
Chicago Blackhawks draft picks
Czech ice hockey left wingers
Edinburgh Capitals players
Everett Silvertips players
HC Morzine-Avoriaz players
People from Beroun
Piráti Chomutov players
HC Sparta Praha players
Sportovní Klub Kadaň players
Sportspeople from the Central Bohemian Region
Czech expatriate ice hockey players in the United States
Czech expatriate ice hockey people
Czech expatriate sportspeople in France
Czech expatriate sportspeople in Scotland
Expatriate ice hockey players in France
Expatriate ice hockey players in Scotland